Shorea waltoni is a species of plant in the family Dipterocarpaceae. It is a large emergent tree up to 60 m tall. The local name seraya kelabu refers to the grey undersurface of the leaf. It is endemic to Borneo, where it is confined to Sabah.

References

waltoni
Endemic flora of Borneo
Trees of Borneo
Taxonomy articles created by Polbot
Taxobox binomials not recognized by IUCN